Plectrothrips is a genus of thrips in the family Phlaeothripidae, first described by Joseph Douglas Hood in 1908.

Species
 Plectrothrips ananthakrishnani
 Plectrothrips angolensis
 Plectrothrips antennatus
 Plectrothrips atactus
 Plectrothrips australis
 Plectrothrips bicolor
 Plectrothrips bicuspis
 Plectrothrips brevitubus
 Plectrothrips capensis
 Plectrothrips collaris
 Plectrothrips corticinus
 Plectrothrips crassiceps
 Plectrothrips crocatus
 Plectrothrips debilis
 Plectrothrips eximius
 Plectrothrips giganteus
 Plectrothrips glaber
 Plectrothrips gracilis
 Plectrothrips hiromasai
 Plectrothrips hoodi
 Plectrothrips indicus
 Plectrothrips latus
 Plectrothrips lobatus
 Plectrothrips longisetis
 Plectrothrips nigricornis
 Plectrothrips okinawanus
 Plectrothrips orientalis
 Plectrothrips pallipes
 Plectrothrips richardi
 Plectrothrips rotundus
 Plectrothrips tenuis
 Plectrothrips thoracicus

References

Phlaeothripidae
Thrips
Thrips genera